Roberto Martínez (born 1973) is a Spanish football manager and former footballer.

Roberto Martinez is also the name of:

Boxers
 Roberto Martínez (Honduran boxer) (born 1966), represented Honduras at the 1988 Summer Olympics
 Roberto Martínez (Uruguayan boxer), represented Uruguay at the 1960 Summer Olympics

Footballers
 Roberto Martínez (footballer, born 1946), Spanish football forward
 Roberto Martínez (footballer, born 1966), Spanish footballer forward
 Roberto Martínez (footballer, born 1967), Peruvian football midfielder
 Roberto Martínez (footballer, born 1973), Salvadoran football defender
 Tiko (footballer), real name Roberto Martínez Rípodas, (born 1976) Spanish footballer

Others
 Roberto Martínez Lacayo of the Liberal-Conservative Junta
 Roberto Martínez (sailor) world champion sailor
 Roberto Martínez (Best English teacher in Novelda)